Al-Sayyed Mohsen al-Amin (b.1284/1867-d.1371/1952), also transliterated Muhsin al Amin, was a Shia scholar, biographer, traditionist, and jurist. He was born in Jabal Amil, Lebanon. His most important work is A'yan al-Shi'a.

Early life and education

Family background 
Al-Amin was born in 1867  to a well-known Sayyid family in Jabal Amil, Lebanon.He was famous for al-Amin or the trusted one. 
His father, Abdul al-Karim al-Amili, was a scholar of his time. His father died in Iraq was buried, when he had gone to pilgrimage Iraq. His maternal grandfather was ′Shaykh Muhammad Hussein al Amili al Musawi, was one of  the scholars who went to Najaf to education and died there.

Education 
Sayyed Mohsen began to study the Qur'an and elementary Arabic grammar at the age of seven under village teacher. Four years later, he learned jurisprudence for three years old under shaykh Musa sharara who returned to Iraq.In 1890, arrangements were made for him to study at the Iraq, Najaf. Finally he was a learned Mujtahid.

Activity 
He was among the pioneers of correcting Shia beliefs in modern times. He forbade (Haram) self-injurious. His action made the rallying most of the uneducated villagers against al Amin's calls for reform. By this action, Amin wanted to rationalize religious practices and make them more moral. He was able to expose a more positive image of the Shia thereby.

His children 
 Hasan al-Amin
 Hashem Al-Amin 
 Abd al-Muttalib Al-Amin
 Jafar Al-Amin
 Muhammad Baqir Al-Amin

Published works 
 Ayan al-Shia, is one of his works. This work the biographical encyclopedia book and consists of fifty-six volumes.
 Al-husun al-mani'a fi radd ma awradahu sahib al-manar fi haqq al-shia, he explained some of the Shia views in this book.
 Risalat al-tanzih li-a'mal al-shabih, that was al-Amin's reply to his critics-Sadiq.
 Al-Sahifa al-Sajjadiyya al-khamisa is the longest version of the Sahifa of al-Sajjad has been published.
 Al-Majalis al-saniyya fi manaqib wa-masa'ib al-'itra al-nabawiyya
 Iqna' al-la'im ala iqamat al-matam
 Lawa'ij al-ashjan fi maqtal al-imam Abi Abd Allah al-Husayn
 Kashf al-Irtiyab fi Atba' Muhammad b. 'Abd al-Wahhab

See also
Islamic scholars
Islamization of knowledge
Islamic philosophy
Ayatollah al-Shirazi
List of Marjas
Allameh Majlesi
Hossein Nasr
Musa al-Sadr

References

Sources 
 Fouad Ajami. The Vanished Imam: Musa Al Sadr and the Shia of Lebanon. Ithaca: Cornell University Press, 1986.

External links
The Shi'is in Lebanon: Between Communal 'Asabiyya and Arab Nationalism, 1908-21 by Kais M. Firro
Lebanese Shiʿites and The Marja'iyya : Polemic in the Late Twentieth Century by RULA JURDI ABISAAB
Lebanese Shiʿites and The Marja'iyya : Polemic in the Late Twentieth Century by Max Weiss

1867 births
1952 deaths
Shia scholars of Islam
19th-century Arabs
20th-century Lebanese people
Pupils of Muhammad Kadhim Khorasani